"Berkatlah Yang DiPertuan Besar Negeri Sembilan" (Jawi: برکتله يڠ دڤرتوان بسر نݢري سمبيلن) is the state anthem of Negeri Sembilan. It was composed by Andrew Caldecott (1884–1951) with lyrics by Tunku Zakaria Mambang. It was adopted as an official state anthem in 1911 at the behest of Tuanku Muhammad Shah (1865–1933), the seventh Yang di-Pertuan Besar, who ruled Negeri Sembilan from 1888 to 1933. 

The anthem was subject to the fine-tuning efforts of the second son of the current Yang DiPertuan Besar, Tunku Zain Al-'Abidin ibni Tuanku Muhriz. The rearranged composition, recorded with the Malaysian Philharmonic Orchestra and choir groups from several schools across the state, was first presented to the public on the installation ceremonies of Tuanku Muhriz and his wife Tuanku Aishah Rohani in early 2009, and it was officially launched on 27 October 2010.

The line "Musuhnya habis binasa" from the anthem serves as motto for the state's football team, Negeri Sembilan FA.

Lyrics

References

Notes

External links
 Instrumental mp3
 Vocal mp3

Negeri Sembilan
Anthems of Malaysia